Zapotitlán Tablas    is one of the 81 municipalities of Guerrero, in south-western Mexico. The municipal seat lies at Zapotitlán Tablas.  The municipality covers an area of 820.9 km².

In 2005, the municipality had a total population of 9,601.

References

Municipalities of Guerrero